Mnesampela is a genus of moths in the family Geometridae. It was described by Edward Guest in 1887.

Species
Mnesampela arida McQuillan, 1985
Mnesampela athertonensis McQuillan, 1985
Mnesampela comarcha Guest, 1887
Mnesampela heliochrysa (Lower, 1893)
Mnesampela kunama McQuillan, 1985
Mnesampela lenaea Meyrick, 1892 – rippled gum moth
Mnesampela privata (Guenée, 1857) – autumn gum moth

References

Nacophorini